Rise or Fall is the fourth album from the anarcho street punk band Defiance, and second release on the New York-based record label Punk Core Records.

Track listing 
Final Hour - 2:50
No Reason - 2:52
Doing What You're Told - 4:23
Still Got Fuck All - 3:06
This Town - 3:18
Death Squad - 2:34
Last Night - 3:47
Screwed Up - 2:57
We're the Ones - 3:54
All the Aces/Forced to Serve - 8:13

Credits 
Pat Kearns - Producer, Engineer
Alan Douches - Mastering
Jocelyn Dean - Photography
Brandnewage - Graphic Design, Layout Design

Defiance (punk band) albums
2004 albums
Punk Core Records albums